Birinci Qaralı (also, Birinji Garaly) is a village in the Neftchala District of Azerbaijan. The village forms part of the municipality of Gadimkend.

References 

Populated places in Neftchala District